This is a list of the mayors of the City of Merri-bek, local government area, Melbourne, Australia. The City of Merri-bek was formed in 1994 with the amalgamation of the City of Brunswick, City of Coburg, and the southern part of the City of Broadmeadows in Victoria, Australia. The name was changed from City of Moreland in September 2022.

Mayors (1996 to present)

See also
 Local government areas of Victoria

References
Former mayors of the City of Merri-bek

External links
Official Merri-bek City Council website

Merri-bek
Mayors Merri-bek
City of Merri-bek